Jenderak is a state constituency in Pahang, Malaysia, that has been represented in the Pahang State Legislative Assembly.

Demographics

History

Polling districts
According to the federal gazette issued on 31 October 2022, the Jenderak constituency is divided into 11 polling districts.

Representation history

Election results

References 

Pahang state constituencies